Guzmania bracteosa is a plant species of flowering plant in the Bromeliaceae family. It is endemic to Ecuador.

References

bracteosa
Flora of Ecuador
Taxa named by Édouard André
Taxa named by Carl Christian Mez